Lu Ying (born 1978) was a former Chinese badminton player from Jiangsu. In the junior event, she participated at the 1996 World Junior Championships clinched a gold medal in the mixed doubles and a silver medal in the girls' doubles event. Partnered with Huang Nanyan, she won her first Grand Prix title in the women's doubles event at the 1999 U.S. Open. In 2000, she won the German Open with Huang Sui. At the 2005 National Games, she helps the Jiangsu team won the bronze medal in the women's team event.

Achievements

World Junior Championships 
Girls' doubles

Mixed doubles

IBF World Grand Prix 
The World Badminton Grand Prix sanctioned by International Badminton Federation (IBF) since 1983.

Women's doubles

References

External links 
 

1978 births
Living people
Badminton players from Jiangsu
Chinese female badminton players